Brachfield (formerly Murval and Needmore) is a community in the Rusk County of Texas in the United States. According to the Handbook of Texas, the community had a population of 40 in 2000. It is located within the Longview, Texas metropolitan area.

History 
The town was named after its creek, Murval Creek in the 1860s, it was nearby Gibson, which was also named after Murval Creek, and they both shared a post office in 1853, with Archibald H. Watkins as postmaster. Families surnamed Watkins, Miller, Brown, Welch, Hannah, and Debard were early settlers here. Trammel's Trace traveled through the community and may have been the source of settlement for the community. It was referred to as Needmore by its local county newspaper from 1892 to 1905 (because it seemingly "needed more" of everything), but to prevent confusion with Needmore, Terry County, Texas, it was renamed again after the residents had stuck with the name. A passing hotel and store were built for people coming from the booming Welch Springs by Nathaniel Johnston, who took over as postmaster in 1896. The town is currently named Brachfield because in 1900 Charles L. Brachfield visited the town and stood in one of its fields to make a speech, a new post office was also named after him but closed in 1906. The locals call speeches like this 'stump speeches' because of the cleared field Brachfield spoke in. Population figures before the 1950s aren't available, but in the 1950s and '60s, the community population peaked at 80, but fell in the '70s and '80s and had 30 people in 1990, then rose again by 10 in the '90s to be 40 in 2000.

Geography

Education
Today, the community is served by the Henderson Independent School District.

References

Unincorporated communities in Rusk County, Texas
Unincorporated communities in Texas
Longview metropolitan area, Texas